Danzhai is a county in the southeast of Guizhou province, China. With a population of approximately 172,000, it is under the administration of the Qiandongnan Miao and Dong Autonomous Prefecture. The region is renowned for its unique geographic, cultural and ethnic diversity, including the distinctive rice terraces, and Miao ethnic crafts and traditions.

In 2014 the Wanda Group designated it as the site for its "Enterprise Sponsored County-wide Comprehensive Poverty Alleviation" programme.  Wanda Group has committed to invest RMB300 million to a Danzhai vocational school, RMB500 million for a Danzhai poverty alleviation fund, and RMB700 million for a Danzhai Wanda Village, which includes a culturally sensitive hotel and town district built in the Miao architectural tradition. Wanda Group's total investments total RMB 1.5 billion and the tourism village is expected to provide up to an additional 3,000 jobs.

Climate

References

External links

County-level divisions of Guizhou
Counties of Qiandongnan Prefecture